Seth William Brown (born July 13, 1992) is an American professional baseball outfielder and first baseman for the Oakland Athletics of Major League Baseball (MLB). He made his MLB debut in 2019.

Early life and amateur career
Brown was born in and grew up in Klamath Falls, Oregon, and initially attended Klamath Union High School. His family moved to Medford, Oregon, going into his senior year in order to shorten his mother's commute to work. Following the move, Brown attended North Medford High School and was named first team All-Southwest Conference and second team OSAA Class 6A All-State as a senior. Both at North Medford and for the Medford Mustangs in American Legion, Brown was a teammate of Major League pitcher Braden Shipley.

Brown began his college career at Linn–Benton Community College, playing for two seasons and was named first team All- Southern Region by the Northwest Athletic Association of Community Colleges as a sophomore. He transferred to Lewis–Clark State College after his sophomore year at the recommendation of LBCC's head coach, Greg Hawk. He was forced to redshirt his junior season due academic issues. In his only season playing for the Warriors, Brown was named a second team National Association of Intercollegiate Athletics (NAIA) All-American after posting a .386 average in while leading the NAIA with 23 home runs and driving in 82 RBIs (2nd in the NAIA) and scoring 78 runs (3rd) as the Warriors went on to win the 2015 NAIA World Series.

Professional career
The Oakland Athletics selected Brown in the 19th round, with the 578th overall selection, of the 2015 MLB Draft. After signing with the team, he was assigned to the Rookie League Arizona League Athletics before being promoted to the Vermont Lake Monsters of the Class A Short Season New York–Penn League after six games. He batted .289 with 19 doubles, three home runs, 35 RBIs and 32 runs scored and was selected to play in the New York–Penn League All-Star Game and was named the Lake Monsters' team MVP. He skipped Class A and began the 2016 season with the Class A-Advanced Stockton Ports, where he hit .241 with eight home runs and 53 RBIs. He was reassigned to the Ports again the next season and increased his offensive production dramatically. Brown was named a California League All-Star and the Player of the Month for August by Minor League Baseball and finished the season with a .270 average while leading the California League with 30 home runs and 109 RBIs. Brown spent the 2018 season with the AA Midland RockHounds, where he batted .283 with 14 home runs and 90 RBIs. He began the 2019 season with the AAA Las Vegas Aviators and was batting .297 with 37 home runs, second in the Pacific Coast League, at the time of his promotion to the Major Leagues.

The Athletics selected Brown's contract on August 26, 2019. He made his debut that night against the Kansas City Royals and recorded his first career hit, a single off Jorge López, in his first career at bat went 2-for-6 overall with an RBI and two runs scored in the A's 19-4 win. Brown batted .293 with eight doubles, two triples, 13 RBIs and 11 runs scored in 26 games played (75 at bats) in his first Major League season. In 2020, Brown only appeared in 7 games, going hitless in five plate appearances for the club. He had his proper rookie season in 2021, when he hit .214/.274/.480 with 20 home runs and 48 RBIs in 111 games.

On June 11, 2022, Brown hit a go-ahead grand slam off of Eli Morgan of the Cleveland Guardians to help lead the Athletics to a 10-5 victory. In 2022 he batted .229/.295/.436/. 39.2% of the pitches to him were fastballs, the lowest percentage of those to any major leaguer.

Personal life
Brown is one of seven siblings. His younger brother, Micah, also played baseball at Lewis–Clark and was a drafted by the Miami Marlins in the 2017 MLB Draft. Brown married Brittaney Niebergall, a former Lewis–Clark basketball player who was named the NAIA Freshman Player of the Year and is currently a middle school teacher and basketball coach.

Brown graduated from Lewis–Clark with a degree in criminal justice and has worked for the Idaho Department of Fish and Game during his offseasons.

References

External links

Lewis–Clark State Warriors bio

1992 births
Living people
People from Klamath Falls, Oregon
Sportspeople from Medford, Oregon
Baseball players from Oregon
Major League Baseball first basemen
Major League Baseball outfielders
Oakland Athletics players
Linn–Benton Roadrunners baseball players
Lewis–Clark State Warriors baseball players
Arizona League Athletics players
Vermont Lake Monsters players
Stockton Ports players
Midland RockHounds players
Toros del Este players
American expatriate baseball players in the Dominican Republic
Las Vegas Aviators players